Meathop is a village in the South Lakeland district of Cumbria, England.

Westmorland Sanatorium, later known as Meathop Hospital, was a sanatorium for patients with tuberculosis. It opened in 1891 and closed in 1991 when it was converted into apartments and renamed as Meathop Grange.

See also

Listed buildings in Meathop and Ulpha

References

External links

 A Vision of Britain Through Time
 British History Online
 British Listed Buildings
 Genuki
 Geograph

Villages in Cumbria
South Lakeland District
Tuberculosis sanatoria in the United Kingdom